Huntington Beach Speedway  (later called Beach Speedway, Talbert Stadium, Huntington Beach Stadium, and American Legion Stadium) was a motorsports racetrack located in Huntington Beach, California.  Designed to host midget car racing, the venue also featured motorcycle races as well as auto polo and other forms of motorsports.  The racetrack operated from 1946 until May 1958 when it closed due to dwindling attendance.

History
In 1946, Tom Talbert purchased  of land west of Beach Blvd and south of Atlanta Avenue in Huntington Beach, CA.  Two promoters convinced Talbert to build a midget car racetrack on the property.  The track would be 1/5th of a mile oval track modeled after Gilmore Stadium in Los Angeles and was designed to be the "finest midget car racetrack on the West Coast."  With a capacity to hold 17,000 spectators, the stadium cost $200,000 to construct.  As television became more popular in the 1950s, attendance began to decline and the stadium began to deteriorate.  In May 1958, Talbert closed the speedway. A series of condominiums now occupies the site.

References

External links
There Used to be a Racetrack - Hidden Huntington Beach

Motorsport venues in California
Defunct motorsport venues in the United States
Defunct sports venues in California
1946 establishments in California
1958 disestablishments in California
Sports venues completed in 1946
Demolished sports venues in California
Huntington Beach, California